The KTM Class 61 is a diesel multiple unit operated by Keretapi Tanah Melayu for KTM Intercity services on non electrified sections of the KTM West Coast railway line and the KTM East Coast railway line.

Background

The idea of using DMUs is not new to KTMB. In 1960, the company operated diesel railcars on short distance services. The railcars operated in multiple unit formation until the mid 1970s, when they were converted into trailers and coupled with conventional diesel locomotives. In the 1980s, KTM ordered railbuses for similar services, but these services ended in the 1990s. Secondhand DMUs were also proposed for KTM Komuter services to make up for the shortage of EMUs, but in the end, the new KTM Class 92 train sets were ordered instead.

Procurement
In 2015, the Business Times reported that KTMB had signed a deal for DMUs with Majestic Engineering, in which the DMUs will be supplied by CRRC. KTMB confirmed its intentions to get DMUs in 2016, pointing out its higher speeds compared to locomotive hauled trains In 2017, KTMB formally announced the procurement of 13 DMUs along with 9 ETS sets from CRRC.

The trains were constructed from 2018 to 2020 by CRRC Zhuzhou Locomotive. The first two sets were built in CRRC’s factory in Zhuzhou, China whereas the remaining eleven were built in CRRC’s factory in Batu Gajah, Malaysia.

Description
They are equipped with graphene-based supercapacitors for storing braking energy and two MAN powerpacks. The diesel engines can be replaced with fuel cells to reach zero emissions operation. The trains are fitted with a Wireless Train Tracker tool for location detection.

Since the trains are used on non-upgraded sections where platform heights are lower, the trains are fitted with retractable steps to aid passengers in boarding. The train bodies themselves are specified to meet the European EN15227 crashworthiness standard.

Features
The trains feature digital passenger information systems, a prayer room and a light catering bar. Nine of the 13 trainsets will have one-third of a vehicle dedicated to carrying parcels and have commuter style seating i.e. a combination of transverse and longitudinal seating layouts. Such trains are meant for regional services such as the Shuttle Timur service. The remaining four sets have 2+2 transverse seating and are meant for long distance travel.

Service History
The trains were speculated to enter service from 1 October 2020, on the Ekspres Selatan from Gemas to JB Sentral as online bookings reflected the new train’s seating arrangement. However, this did not eventuate. When in service, they are expected to cut journey times as their operating speed of 100 km/h is higher than the average speed of existing trains which is at 50–60 km/h.

KTMB held a launch party for the new trains for 11 April 2021, inaugurating DMU service between Tumpat, Gua Musang and Kuala Lipis. From 21 February 2022, the trains were fully utilised on the east coast line with the opening of shuttle timuran 35up/38dn from Kuala Lipis to Gemas.

References

Multiple units of Malaysia
Keretapi Tanah Melayu
Train-related introductions in 2018
CRRC multiple units